Raorchestes beddomii (Beddome's bubble-nest frog or Beddome's bush frog) is a species of frog in the family Rhacophoridae. It is endemic to southern Western Ghats of southwestern India in Kerala (Athirimala and Munnar) and Tamil Nadu (Kannikatti). Its name honours Colonel Richard Henry Beddome who collected the type specimen.

Description

Their colouration is nearly uniformly green on dorsum, dorsal side of forelimbs, hindlimbs, and loreal and tympanic regions. Their iris is reddish brown. Size and colouration varies between the populations; frogs from Munnar were the larger and had lighter colour.

Habitat
Raorchestes beddomii are found in moist forest patches as well as in wayside vegetation and tea plantations. Calling males are usually sitting on leaves, some 1.5 metres above the ground. It is not directly threatened, but the known distribution area is small.

References

External links

beddomii
Frogs of India
Endemic fauna of the Western Ghats
Taxonomy articles created by Polbot
Amphibians described in 1876
Taxa named by Albert Günther